Caravane is the brand name of a camel milk cheese produced in Mauritania by Tiviski, a company founded by Nancy Abeiderrhamane in 1987. The milk used to make the cheese is collected from the local animals of a thousand nomadic herdsmen, is very difficult to produce, and yields a product that is low in lactose.  As Mauritanians do not generally eat cheese, and the European Commission has not yet fully implemented policies designed for dromedary milk products, Caravane is difficult to find in Europe. Its availability is largely limited to Nouakchott shops and restaurants, and as an export to neighboring Senegal. It can now be purchased in select stores in New York.

See also 
 Camel § Dairy
 List of cheeses

References

External links 
 Tiviskis website

Mauritanian cheeses
Mauritanian cuisine
Cheeses by animal's milk